Morristown-Hamblen High School West (also known as Morristown West High School) is a secondary school located in Morristown, Tennessee. The school incorporates grades 9-12. Their mascot is the Trojan and the school colors are crimson and white. The school had an enrollment over 1,600 students as of the 2010-11 school year. Jeff Kinsler is the head principal.

History
Morristown-Hamblen High School West opened as a new school of the Morristown City School System in September 1968, with an enrollment of 1,050 students. The building was constructed on a 33-acre site at a cost of approximately three million dollars. Morristown students who lived West of Cumberland Avenue were eligible to enroll in the school. The school's name was suggested by the Hamblen County School Board and was approved by the Morristown City School Commission, with the new High School, Morristown High School change its name to Morristown-Hamblen High School East. Prior to the opening of the school, a committee composed of the superintendent, board members, and students selected "Trojans" as the nickname and crimson and white as the school colors. In April 1970, a visiting committee sponsored by the Southern Association of Colleges and Schools evaluated the school to decide eligibility for accreditation by that organization.

The school was accepted as a member of the Southern Association of Colleges and Schools in the fall of 1970 and has kept its high standing in the Association to the present. Morristown-Hamblen High School West became part of the Hamblen County School System in January 1986. The Hamblen County Board of Education started an extensive building program in 1989. Sixteen classrooms, including a special education wing, a science laboratory, a new agriculture shop, an assistant principal's office and a computer lab were added. The auditorium was also remodeled at this time.

The school constructed a weight room with dressing facilities and a new surface for the outdoor track in 1990. Additionally, they installed new heating and cooling systems throughout the building in 1997. The faculty, parents and community continue to support the growth and improvement of the school programs as showed by the contributions toward the creation of a state-of-the art exercise room with superior equipment and the construction of a new baseball and softball field and stadium. Other improvements have included library scanning and security systems, a new parking lot, a new greenhouse, and auditorium equipment. Replacement desks in classrooms have been provided, along with the updating or replacement of new computers in the library and computer labs.

Recent improvements include new tile in the library, classrooms, and primary office. Two roof units have been installed to vent fresh air into seventeen interior classrooms. A new agriculture classroom and horticulture potting room were constructed. A new curtain was bought for the auditorium, and the fence was replaced along the front of the school. New cafeteria tables with school logo are the newest additions to the school.

Hamblen County continues to grow westward, and as a result, Morristown-Hamblen High School West's enrollment has increased in recent years. Future facility improvements and enlargements are being investigated, as is addition of personnel. Plans are being drawn for a major renovation and redesigned project for the school

Speech and debate
The Morristown West Speech and Debate Team, known at the Chestnut Tree competes in tournaments all throughout the south.

Sports
Sports offered at Morristown West High School are Baseball, Basketball (Men & Women's), Cheerleading, Cross Country, American Football, Golf, Soccer (Men & Women's), Softball, Swimming, Tennis, Track, Volleyball, & Wrestling

Women's Soccer - 2010 Conference Champions
Women's Basketball - On March 11, 2010, Morristown West High School Lady Trojans team competed for the TSSAA Class AAA 2010 Girls Basketball State Championship, & were able to advance to the finals. On March 13, the Lady Trojans lost the finals to Riverdale High School with a score of 59 to 42. Lady Trojans basketball team won State Runner Up with a record of 34-2 all season.  This is the farthest any Morristown West Lady Basketball team has ever gone. Taylor Hall, senior basketball player, was announced the Division I, Class AAA Miss Basketball Award Winner.
Wrestling - 2010 Prep Extra Champions. 2011 Battle of Morristown Tournament Champions. The team has had two individual state champions in its history.
Varsity Cheerleaders - On April 13, 2010, the Morristown West High varsity cheerleaders won first place in the state at the AAA Girl's State Basketball Tournament held in Murfreesboro, Tennessee.
Men's Basketball -2018-2019 Season  West High was co-champions of the IMAC, tied with Morristown East. The season saw the Trojans win the most games in basketball since the 90's.  This team consisting of nine seniors, two Juniors and a sophomore won the InnisFree Hotels Basketball Tournament in Pensacola Fl.

Notable alumni
 Darrius Blevins, retired NFL player
 James Stewart, retired NFL player

References

External links
Hamblen County Department of Education
National Center for Education Statistics data for Morristown West High School
TSSAA Class AAA 2010 Girls Basketball State Championship Scoreboard
wgnsradio.com

Educational institutions established in 1968
Public high schools in Tennessee
Schools in Hamblen County, Tennessee
1968 establishments in Tennessee
Morristown, Tennessee